Alejandro 'Álex' Cacho Hernández (born 3 September 1987) is a Spanish footballer who plays for CA Cirbonero as a right back.

Club career
Born in Ágreda, Province of Soria, Cacho graduated from local CD Numancia's youth system, making his senior debuts with the reserves in the 2006–07 season, in Tercera División. On 5 September 2007 he made his professional debut, starting in a 0–2 away loss against Hércules CF, for the season's Copa del Rey.

In the 2008 summer Cacho left Numancia, and competed in Segunda División B in the following seasons, representing Ontinyent CF (two stints), UE Sant Andreu, Lleida Esportiu, FC Cartagena, Sestao River and CD Izarra.

References

External links

1987 births
Living people
Spanish footballers
Footballers from Castile and León
Association football defenders
Segunda División B players
Tercera División players
CD Numancia B players
Ontinyent CF players
UE Sant Andreu footballers
Lleida Esportiu footballers
FC Cartagena footballers
Sestao River footballers
CD Izarra footballers